Residual topology  is a descriptive stereochemical term to classify a number of intertwined and interlocked molecules, which cannot be disentangled in an experiment without breaking of covalent bonds, while the strict rules of mathematical topology allow such a disentanglement. Examples of such molecules are rotaxanes, catenanes with covalently linked rings (so-called pretzelanes), and open knots (pseudoknots) which are abundant in proteins.

The term "residual topology" was suggested on account of a striking similarity of these compounds to the well-established topologically nontrivial species, such as catenanes and knotanes (molecular knots). The idea of residual topological isomerism introduces a handy scheme of modifying the molecular graphs and generalizes former efforts of systemization of mechanically bound and bridged molecules.

References

Molecular topology
Stereochemistry